Eosinophilic esophagitis (EoE) is an allergic inflammatory condition of the esophagus that involves eosinophils, a type of white blood cell.  In healthy individuals, the esophagus is typically devoid of eosinophils. In EoE, eosinophils migrate to the esophagus in large numbers. When a trigger food is eaten, the eosinophils contribute to tissue damage and inflammation. Symptoms include swallowing difficulty, food impaction, vomiting, and heartburn.

Eosinophilic esophagitis was first described in children but also occurs in adults. The condition is not well understood, but food allergy may play a significant role. The treatment may consist of removal of known or suspected triggers and medication to suppress the immune response. In severe cases, it may be necessary to enlarge the esophagus with an endoscopy procedure.

While knowledge about EoE has been increasing rapidly, diagnosis of EoE can be challenging because the symptoms and histo-pathologic findings are not specific.

Signs and symptoms 
EoE often presents with difficulty swallowing, food impaction, stomach pains, regurgitation or vomiting, and decreased appetite. Although the typical onset of EoE is in childhood, the disease can be found in all age groups, and symptoms vary depending on the age of presentation. In addition, young children with EoE may present with feeding difficulties and poor weight gain. It is more common in males, and affects both adults and children.

Predominant symptoms in school-aged children and adolescents include difficulty swallowing, food impaction, and choking/gagging with meals- particularly when eating foods with coarse textures. Other symptoms in this age group can include abdominal/chest pain, vomiting, and regurgitation. The predominant symptom in adults is difficulty swallowing; however, intractable heartburn and food avoidance may also be present. Due to the long-standing inflammation and possible resultant scarring that may have gone unrecognized, adults presenting with EoE tend to have more episodes of esophageal food impaction as well as other esophageal abnormalities such as Schatzki ring, esophageal webs, and in some cases, achalasia.

Although many of these symptoms overlap with the symptoms of GERD, the majority of patients with EoE exhibit a poor response to acid-suppression therapy. Many people with EoE have other autoimmune and allergic diseases such as asthma and celiac disease. Mast cell disorders such as Mast Cell Activation Syndrome or Mastocytosis are also frequently associated with it.

Pathophysiology 
Eosinophils are inflammatory cells that release a variety of chemical signals which inflame the surrounding esophageal tissue. This results in the signs and symptoms of pain, visible redness on endoscopy, and a natural history that may include stricturing. Eosinophils are normally present in other parts of a healthy gastrointestinal tract, these white blood cells are not normally found in the esophagus of a healthy individual. The reason for the migration of eosinophils to the tissue of the esophagus is not fully understood but is being studied extensively. It is thought the migration of eosinophils to the esophagus may be due to genetic, environmental, and host immune system factors.

At a tissue level, EoE is characterized by a dense infiltrate with white blood cells of the eosinophil type into the epithelial lining of the esophagus. This is thought to be an allergic reaction against ingested food, based on the important role eosinophils play in allergic reactions. The eosinophils are recruited into the tissue in response to local production of eotaxin-3 by IL-13 stimulated esophageal epithelial cells.

Diagnosis 

The diagnosis of EoE is typically made on the combination of symptoms and findings on diagnostic testing. To properly diagnose EoE, various diseases such as GERD, esophageal cancer, achalasia, hypereosinophilic syndrome, infection, Crohn's disease, and drug allergies need to be ruled out.

Prior to the development of the EE Diagnostic Panel, EoE could only be diagnosed if gastroesophageal reflux did not respond to a six-week trial of twice-a-day high-dose proton-pump inhibitors (PPIs) or if a negative ambulatory pH study ruled out gastroesophageal reflux disease (GERD).

Radiologically, the term "ringed esophagus" has been used for the appearance of eosinophilic esophagitis on barium swallow studies to contrast with the appearance of transient transverse folds sometimes seen with esophageal reflux (termed "feline esophagus").

Endoscopy 
Endoscopically, ridges, furrows, or rings may be seen in the esophageal wall. Sometimes, multiple rings may occur in the esophagus, leading to the term "corrugated esophagus" or "feline esophagus" due to similarity of the rings to the cat esophagus. Presence of white exudates in esophagus is also suggestive of the diagnosis. On biopsy taken at the time of endoscopy, numerous eosinophils can be seen in the superficial epithelium. A minimum of 15 eosinophils per high-power field are required to make the diagnosis. Eosinophilic inflammation is not limited to the esophagus alone, and does extend through the whole gastrointestinal tract. Profoundly degranulated eosinophils may also be present, as may micro-abscesses and an expansion of the basal layer.

Patients found to have signs of EoE on endoscopy should undergo an empiric 8-week trial of high-dose proton pump inhibitor therapy (twice daily) before repeat endoscopy in order to rule out GERD. Although endoscopic findings are helpful in identifying patients with EoE, they are not diagnostic of the disease if the patient has no clinical symptoms.

Esophageal mucosal biopsy 

Currently, endoscopic mucosal biopsy remains the most important diagnostic test for EoE, and is required to confirm the diagnosis. Biopsy specimens from both the proximal/mid and distal esophagus should be obtained regardless of the gross appearance of the mucosa. Specimens should also be obtained from areas revealing endoscopic abnormalities. At least four biopsies are required to obtain adequate sensitivity for the detection of EoE. A definitive diagnosis of EoE is based on the presence of at least 15 eosinophils/HPF in the esophageal biopsies of patients despite treatment with high-dose PPI. GERD can increase eosinophilic infiltration in the distal esophagus, however, eosinophils associated with GERD generally occur at a lower density (i.e. < 15/HPF).

Allergy assessment 
A thorough personal and family history of other atopic conditions is recommended in all patients with EoE. Testing for allergic sensitization may be considered using skin prick testing or blood testing for allergen-specific IgE. This is particularly important for the 10–20% of EoE patients who also have symptoms of immediate IgE-mediated food allergy. Atopy patch testing has been used in some cases for the potential identification of delayed, non-IgE (cell-mediated) reactions.

Diagnostic criteria 
The diagnosis of eosinophilic esophagitis requires all of the following:
 Symptoms related to esophageal dysfunction.
 Eosinophil-predominant inflammation on esophageal biopsy, characteristically consisting of a peak value of ≥15 eosinophils per high power field (HPF).
 Exclusion of other causes that may be responsible for symptoms and esophageal eosinophilia.

Treatment 

The goal of EoE treatment is to control the symptoms by decreasing the number of eosinophils in the esophagus and, subsequently, reducing the esophageal inflammation. Management consists of dietary, pharmacological, and endoscopic treatment.

Dietary management
Dietary treatment can be effective, as there does appear to be a role of allergy in the development of EOE. Allergy testing is not particularly effective in predicting which foods are driving the disease process. If no specific allergenic food or agent is present, a trial of the six food elimination diet (SFED) can be pursued. Various approaches have been tried, where either six food groups (cow's milk, wheat, egg, soy, nuts and fish/seafood), four groups (animal milk, gluten-containing cereals, egg, legumes) or two groups (animal milk and gluten-containing cereals) are excluded for a period of time, usually six weeks. A "top down" (starting with six foods, then reintroducing) approach may be very restrictive. Four- or even two-group exclusion diets may be less difficult to follow and reduce the need for many endoscopies if the response to the limited restriction is good.

Alternative options to SFED includes the elemental diet, which is an amino acid based diet. The elemental diet demonstrates a high rate of response (almost 90% in children, 70% in adults), with a rapid relief of symptoms associated with histological remission. This diet involves using amino-acid based liquid formulas for 4-6 wk, followed by the histological evaluation of response. If remission is achieved, foods are slowly reintroduced.

Pharmacologic treatment 
In patients diagnosed with EoE, a trial of proton-pump inhibitors (PPI), such as esomeprazole 20 mg to 40 mg oral daily or twice daily as a first line therapy is a reasonable option. Nexium®, brand name esomeprazole, may be preferred as these tablets can be dispersed in half a glass of water and drank for those with difficulty swallowing pills. Those who respond to PPI therapy with symptomatic improvement, should have endoscopy with esophageal biopsy should be repeated. If no eosinophils are present in the repeat biopsy, the diagnosis is either acid mediated GERD with eosinophilia or non GERD PPI responsive EoE with unknown mechanism. If both symptoms and eosinophils persists after treatment with PPI, the diagnosis is immune mediated EoE.

Medical therapy for immune mediated EoE primarily involves using corticosteroids. Systemic (oral) corticosteroids were one of the first treatment options shown to be effective in patients with EoE. Both clinical and histologic improvement have been noted in approximately 95% of EoE patients using systemic corticosteroids. However, upon discontinuation of therapy, 90% of patients using corticosteroids experience a recurrence in symptoms. In May 2022, U.S. Food and Drug Administration approved dupilumab (Dupixent) to treat eosinophilic esophagitis (EoE) in adults and pediatric patients 12 years and older weighing at least 40 kilograms (which is about 88 pounds) making it the first US FDA approved treatment for EoE.

Endoscopic dilatation
In patients who present with food impaction, flexible upper endoscopy is recommended to remove impacted food. Dilation is deferred in EoE until patients are adequately treated with pharmacological or dietary therapy, and the result of a response to therapy is available. The goals of therapy for treating EoE is to improve the patient's symptoms as well as to reduce the number of eosinophils on biopsy. This procedure is effective in 84% of people who require it.

Esophageal strictures and rings can be safely dilated in EoE. It is recommended to use a graduated balloon catheter for gradual dilation. The patient should be informed that after dilation they might experience chest pain and in addition risk of esophageal perforation and bleeding.

Prognosis 
The long-term prognosis for patients with EoE is unknown. Some patients may follow a “waxing and waning” course characterized by symptomatic episodes followed by periods of remission. There have also been reports of apparent spontaneous disease remission in some patients; however, the risk of recurrence in these patients is unknown. It is possible that long-standing, untreated disease may result in esophageal remodeling, leading to strictures, Schatzki ring and, eventually, achalasia.

Risk Factors 
There are many environmental factors that can increase the risk of developing EoE along with genetic factors for the disorder. The prevalence of EoE seems to be trending and there are many ongoing studies to try and find out why this may be. Risk factors for EoE include autoimmune conditions such as, inflammatory bowel disease and rheumatoid arthritis. Those with celiac disease, another autoimmune condition, are at higher risk of developing EoE as well. Individuals living in dry or cold climates as well as those living in areas of low population density are associated with higher rates of EoE. Food allergens are a risk factor of EoE and can often be directly attributed to the disease. Often times removing these food allergens from the diet can resolve EoE symptoms.

Epidemiology 
The prevalence of eosinophilic esophagitis has increased over time and currently ranges from 1 to 6 per 10,000 persons. Gender and ethnic variations exist in the prevalence of EoE, with the majority of cases reported in Caucasian males.

In addition to gender (male predominance) and race (mainly a disease of Caucasian individuals), established risk factors for EoE include atopy and other allergic conditions. Other recognized genetic and environmental risk factors for EoE include alterations in gut barrier function (e.g. GERD), variation in the nature and timing of oral antigen exposure, lack of early exposure to microbes, and an altered microbiome. A study comparing active EoE children to non EoE children found an altered microbiome due to a positive correlation between a relatively high abundance of Haemophilus and disease activity seen through an increasing Eosinophilic Esophagitis Endoscopic Reference Score and Eosinophilic Esophagitis Histologic Scoring System (q value = 5e-10). Measuring the relative abundance of specific taxa in children’s salivary microbiome could serve as a noninvasive marker for eosinophilic esophagitis.

History
The first case of eosinophilic esophagitis was reported in 1978. In the early 1990s, it became recognized as a distinct disease.

See also 
 Eosinophilic gastroenteritis

References

External links 

Esophagus disorders
Immune system disorders
Steroid-responsive inflammatory conditions